The Masters is a Grand Slam event on the men's and women's World Curling Tour. It is the second Grand Slam event and first major on the women's and men's tour. The event is an amalgamation of the men's World Cup of Curling and the women's Sun Life Classic. There was also a men's Sun Life Classic, which has been discontinued. The Sun Life Classic was an annual WCT event (but not a Grand Slam event) held every November at the Paris Curling Club, Brant Curling Club and the Brantford Golf & Country Club in the Brantford, Ontario area. The World Cup was a Grand Slam event and was held in various locations across Canada, and was also previously known as the Masters.

The first incarnation of the event with both men and women was held in 2012 at the Wayne Gretzky Sports Centre and the Brantford Golf & Country Club in Brantford, Ontario.

Previous event names

Sun Life Classic
Grandview Chain and Cable Cashspiel (2005)
Tim Hortons Invitational Classic (2006)
McDonald's Invitational (men's) / Sun Life Invitational (women's) (2007)
SunLife Financial Invitational Classic (2008)
Sun Life Classic (2009–2011)

Masters/World Cup
Kia Masters of Curling: 2002 
M&M Meat Shops Masters of Curling: 2003-2004
Masters of Curling: Feb. 2006
Home Hardware Masters of Curling: Dec. 2006-Jan. 2008
Masters of Curling: Nov. 2008
Grey Power World Cup of Curling: 2009-2010
GP Car and Home World Cup of Curling: 2011
Rogers Masters of Curling: 2012
Masters of Curling: 2013-15
WFG Masters: 2016
Masters of Curling: 2017
Canadian Beef Masters: 2018
Masters: 2019–present

Past champions

Masters/World Cup

Men

Notes
1. Greg Balsdon subbed in for Mead in the final game.

Women

Sun Life Classic
Past champions are listed as follows:

Men

Women

References

External links

 
Men's Grand Slam (curling) events
Women's Grand Slam (curling) events
Annual sporting events in Canada